Gareth Baber (born 23 May 1972) is a Welsh former rugby player and now a rugby union coach. He is best known for coaching and leading the Fiji sevens team to win their second gold medal in rugby sevens at the 2020 Tokyo Olympics. He coached Fiji to their fourth World Sevens Series title. He has won the most tournaments in the world series as coach for the Fiji Islands. 

During his playing career Baber earned a Blue for Oxford University's rugby team. He also featured at scrum-half for Pontypridd RFC, and featured prominently in Pontypridd's European Shield victory over London Irish in 2001 where he appeared on the wing.

Coaching
Baber was assistant coach with the Wales national under-20 team. Baber was also academy skills coach at Welsh regional side Cardiff Blues. In July 2011 Baber and Justin Burnell were appointed Head Coaches of the Cardiff Blues following the resignation of Dai Young.

In November 2013, Baber became head of Hong Kong men's rugby sevens and directed the senior men's, women's and youth programmes at elite level. In October 2016 he signed four-year contract with Fiji Rugby Union to coach the Fiji national rugby sevens team. Since becoming the Fiji sevens team head coach, he has won eleven tournaments with them, beating the previous record set by Ben Ryan of nine. He also guided Fiji in winning the 2018-19 World Rugby Sevens Series after close a battle for points with the United States throughout the series. He is now an Olympic winner after winning gold in rugby sevens at the Tokyo 2020 Games.

References

External links
Newport Gwent Dragons profile
Welsh Rugby Union profile
Pontypridd RFC profile

Welsh rugby union coaches
Welsh rugby union players
Pontypridd RFC players
Dragons RFC players
Bristol Bears players
Oxford University RFC players
Rugby union players from Cardiff
Alumni of the University of Oxford
Aberavon RFC players
Rugby sevens players at the 2006 Commonwealth Games
1972 births
Living people
Commonwealth Games rugby sevens players of Wales